WIKZ (95.1 FM, "Mix 95.1") is a hot adult contemporary formatted broadcast radio station licensed to Chambersburg, Pennsylvania, serving the Hagerstown/Chambersburg/Martinsburg area.  WIKZ is owned and operated by Alpha Media.

References

External links
Mix 95 Online

IKZ
Radio stations established in 1948
Alpha Media radio stations